Glenn Marsland (born 30 June 1947) is an Australian basketball player. He competed in the men's tournament at the 1972 Summer Olympics. 

In 1972 at the time of the Munich Olympic Massacre, Glenn was a Physical Education Teacher at Unley High School, Kitchener Street, Netherby, South Australia.

References

External links
 

1947 births
Living people
Australian men's basketball players
1974 FIBA World Championship players
Olympic basketball players of Australia
Basketball players at the 1972 Summer Olympics
Place of birth missing (living people)